Louye is a commune in the Eure department in Normandy in northern France. Louye is situated roughly 76 km from Paris.

Population

See also
Communes of the Eure department

References

Communes of Eure